Rexanne Becnel is an American romance novelist. She lives in New Orleans.

Bibliography

Novels
My Gallant Enemy (1990)
Thief of My Heart (1991)
The Rose of Blacksword (1992)
Christmas Journey (1992)
A Dove at Midnight (1993)
The Christmas Wish (1993)
Where Magic Dwells (1994)
Heart of the Storm (1995)
When Lightning Strikes (1996)
The Maiden Bride (1996)
Dangerous To Love (1997)
The Bride of Rosecliffe (1998)
The Knight of Rosecliffe (1999)
The Mistress of Rosecliffe (2000)
The Matchmaker (2001)
The Troublemaker (2001)
The Bridemaker (2002)
The Heartbreaker (2003)
Old Boyfriends (2005)
The Payback Club (2006)
Leaving L.A. (2006)
Blink Of An Eye (2007)
The Thief's Only Child (2011)

Short stories
The Wager (1997)
The Love Match (1998)

External links
Rexanne Becnel at Fantastic Fiction
Historical Romance Writers Author: Rexanne Becnel
Interview with Rexanne Becnel at A Romance Review

20th-century American novelists
21st-century American novelists
American romantic fiction writers
American women novelists
Living people
Year of birth missing (living people)
20th-century American women writers
21st-century American women writers
20th-century American short story writers
21st-century American short story writers